Hard-leaf wattle is a common name for several plants and may refer to:

 Acacia sclerophylla, endemic to southern Australia
 Acacia spinescens